The Beaux-Arts de Paris is a French grande école whose primary mission is to provide high-level arts education and training. This is classical and historical School of Fine Arts in France. The art school, which is part of the Paris Sciences et Lettres University, is located on two sites: Saint-Germain-des-Prés in Paris, and Saint-Ouen.

The Parisian institution is made up of a complex of buildings located at 14 rue Bonaparte, between the quai Malaquais and the rue Bonaparte. This is in the heart of Saint-Germain-des-Prés, just across the Seine from the Louvre museum. The school was founded in 1648 by Charles Le Brun as the famed French academy Académie royale de peinture et de sculpture. In 1793, at the height of the French Revolution, the institutes were suppressed. However, in 1817, following the Bourbon Restoration, it was revived under a changed name after merging with the Académie d'architecture. Held under the King's tutelage until 1863, an imperial decree on November 13, 1863 named the school's director, who serves for a five-year term. Long supervised by the Ministry of Public Instruction, the École des Beaux-Arts is now a public establishment under the Ministry of Culture.

History
The Beaux-Arts de Paris is the original of a series of Écoles des beaux-arts in French regional centers. Since its founding in 1648, the Académie royale de peinture et de sculpture has had a school, France's elite institution of instruction in the arts. Its program was structured around a series of anonymous competitions that culminated in the grand prix de l'Académie Royale, more familiar as the Grand Prix de Rome, for its winner was awarded a bourse and a place at the French Academy in Rome. During his stay in Rome, a pensionnaire  was expected to send regular envois of his developing work back to Paris. Contestants for the Prix were assigned a theme from the literature of classical antiquity; their individual identities were kept secret to avoid any scandal of favoritism.

With his final admission into the Académie, the new member had to present his fellow academicians a morceau de réception, a painting or sculpture that demonstrated his learning, intelligence, and proficiency in his art. Jacques-Louis David's Andromache Mourning Hector was his reception offering in 1783; today it is in the collections of the Louvre Museum.

In 1793, during the French Revolution, the Académie Royale and the grand prix de l'Académie Royale were abolished, but only a few years later, in 1797, the Prix de Rome was re-established. Each year throughout the nineteenth century, the winner of the Prix de Rome was granted five years of study at the Villa Medici, after which the painter or sculptor could fully expect to embark on a successful official career.

The program resulted in the accumulation of some great collections at the Académie, one of the finest collections of French drawings, many of them sent as envoies from Rome, as well as the paintings and sculptures, usually the winners, of the competitions, or salons. Lesser competitions, known as the petits concours, took themes like history composition (which resulted in many sketches illustrating instructive moments from antiquity), expressions of the emotions, and full and half-figure painting.

In its role as a teaching institution, the École assembled a large collection of Italian and French etchings and engravings, dating from the 16th through the 18th century. Such prints published the composition of paintings to a wide audience. The print collection was first made available to students outside the Académie in 1864.

Today, studies include: painting, installation, graphic arts, photography, sculpture, digital media and video. Beaux-Arts de Paris provides the highest level of training in contemporary art production. Throughout history, many world-renowned artists have either taught or studied at this institution. The faculty is made up of recognized international artists. Theoretical courses permitting diverse approaches to the history of the arts complement studio work, which is supported by technical training and access to technical bases. The media center provides students with rich documentation on art, and organizes conferences, seminars, and debates throughout the year. The School buildings have architectural interest and house prestigious historical collections and an extensive fine arts library. The school publishes a dozen texts per year on different collections, and holds exhibitions ranging from the school's excellent collection of old-master drawings to the most up to date contemporary works, in the Quai Malaquais space and the Chapel throughout the year.

Collections
The school owns circa 450,000 items divided between artworks and historical books, making it one of the largest public art collections in France. The collection encompasses many types of artistic productions, from painting and sculpture to etching, furniture or decorated books and from all the periods of art history. Many pieces of the collection are artworks created by students of the School throughout its history but former students and scholars also contributed to enlarge the holdings with many gifts and donations to the institution. The collection consists in approximatively 2,000 paintings (including pictures by Nicolas Poussin, Anthony van Dyck, Hyacinthe Rigaud, Jean-Honoré Fragonard, Hubert Robert and Ingres), 600 pieces of decorative arts, 600 architectural elements, nearly 15,000 medals, 3,700 sculptures, 20,000 drawings including works by Paolo Veronese, Primaticcio, Jacques Bellange, Michelangelo, Charles Le Brun, Nicolas Poussin, Claude Gellée, Dürer, Rembrandt, Ingres, François Boucher or Pierre Alechinsky, 45,000 architectural drawings, 100,000 etchings and engravings, 70,000 photographs (mainly form the period 1850–1914), 65,000 books dating from the 15th to the 20th century (3,500 for the 15th and 16th centuries), and 1,000 handwritten pieces of archive (letters, inventories, notes...) and also 390 important fragments or complete illuminated manuscripts.

Campus

The physical setting of the school stands on about two hectares in the Saint-Germain-des-Prés section of Paris.  The main entrance at 14 Rue Bonaparte is flanked by colossal carved heads of Pierre Paul Puget and Nicolas Poussin (done in 1838 by Michel-Louis Victor Mercier).

Before 1816, Beaux-Arts students were taught elsewhere.  This land had been the convent of the Petits Augustins, then the site of Alexandre Lenoir's collection of architectural fragments from across France, the Musée des Monuments français (1795–1816), assembled here as a result of the destruction of churches and noble chateaux during the revolution.

In 1830, architect Félix Duban, a former student and winner of the Grand Prix de Rome, began a transformation of the site by demolishing a few existing houses, moving back the convent's cloister on the right to produce a symmetrical courtyard, and designing the largest central building, the Palais des Études.  Duban simply incorporated many of Lenoir's historical fragments, notably the portal of the 1548 Château d'Anet, and in the courtyard a facade from the Château de Gaillon, since removed and returned to its original site in 1977.

In other ways Duban meant the entire complex as an open-air encyclopedia for artists and architects.  The Palais des Études building features elaborate frescoes, the stairwells demonstrate various wall finishes, and the courtyard (glassed over by Duban in 1863) once held classical statuary and full-size copies of the columns of the Parthenon for study.

The core of the complex is a semi-circular award theater within the Palais, the Hémicycle d'Honneur, where the prizes were awarded.  Duban commissioned Paul Delaroche to produce a great mural, 27 metres long, to represent seventy-five great artists of all ages, in conversation, assembled in groups.  In the middle are three thrones occupied by the creators of the Parthenon: sculptor Phidias, architect Ictinus, and painter Apelles, symbolizing the unity of these arts.  The mural took Delaroche three and a half years to complete, and it still stands as a powerful expression of the Beaux-Arts collaborative ideal.

Duban continued to expand and improve the complex for decades.  Other major buildings include the 1820 Bâtiment des Loges, the modified cloister now called the Cour des Mûriers, the 1862 Bâtiment des Expositions which extended the campus to the Quai Malaquias, the Hôtel de Chimay built circa 1750 and acquired by the school in 1884, and a block of studios constructed circa 1945 in concrete by Auguste Perret.

Palais des Études

Chapel

Academic staff

Directors

 Jean-Baptiste Claude Eugène Guillaume, 1864–1878
 Paul Dubois, 1878
 François Wehrlin
 Yves Michaud, 1989–1997
 Alfred Pacquement
 Nicolas Untersteller 1948
 Jean-Didier Wolframm
 Henry-Claude Cousseau
 Nicolas Bourriaud,  2011–2015
 Jean-Marc Bustamante, 2015–2019
 Jean de Loisy, 2019–2021
 Alexia Fabre, 2022-

Notable instructors

 Marina Abramović
 Pierre Alechinsky
 Louis-Jules André
 Maurice Benayoun
 François Boisrond
 Christian Boltanski
 Duchenne de Boulogne
 Jean-Marc Bustamante
 Alexandre Cabanel
 Pierre Carron
 Béatrice Casadesus
 Jean-François Chevrier
 César
 Nina Childress
 Claude Closky
 Leonardo Cremonini
 Richard Deacon
 Olivier Debré
 Louis Girault
 Julien Guadet
 Fabrice Hybert
 Victor Laloux
 Jean-Paul Laurens
 Barbara Leisgen
 Charles Le Brun
 Henri Lehmann
 Michel Marot
 Antonin Mercié
 Annette Messager
 Gustave Moreau
 Jean-Louis Pascal
 Auguste Perret
 Emmanuel Pontremoli
 Abraham Pincas
 Paul Richer
 Charles-Caïus Renoux
 Jean-Joseph Sue, father
 Jean-Joseph Sue, son
 Tadashi Kawamata
 Tatiana Trouvé
 Jean-Luc Vilmouth

Notable alumni

 Agegnehu Engida, painter
 Nadir Afonso, painter
 Paul Ahyi, painter, sculptor, designer of the flag of Togo
 Theo Akkermann, German sculptor
 Wahbi al-Hariri, sculpture, painting, and architecture
 Rodolfo Amoedo, painting
 Beatrice Valentine Amrhein, painting
 Ouanes Amor, painting
 Émile André, architecture
 Ximena Armas, painting
 Yolande Ardissone, painting
 Léon Azéma, architecture
 Théodore Ballu, architecture
 Lucien Georges Bazor, sculpture
 Ahmed Benyahia, painting, sculpture, film
 Jean-Francois Bocle, painter
 Ernest Boiceau, drawing, painting and architecture
 Maurice Boitel, painting
 Michel Bouvet, designer & poster artist
 Antoine Bourdelle, sculpture
 David Tai Bornoff, installation, multi-media, film
 Bernard Buffet, painting
 Antoine Camilleri, painting 
 Paul-Henry Chombart de Lauwe. sociologist
 Olivia Chaumont, architect and transgender activist 
 Eugène Chigot, painting
 Georgette Cottin-Euziol, French Algerian architect
 Aimé-Jules Dalou, sculpture
 Henri-Camille Danger, painting
 Mario Pani Darqui, architecture
 Jacques-Louis David, painting
 Gabriel Davioud, architecture
 Olivier Debré, painting
 Edgar Degas, painting
 Eugène Delacroix, painting
 Marie-Antoinette Demagnez, sculpture
 Jean Desbois, architecture
 Louis Deschamps, painting
 Paul Devautour, installation, multi-media
 Jean Dries, painting
 Félix Duban, architecture
 Dominique Duplantier, drawing, painting and architecture
 Henri Evenepoel, painting
 Fang Ganmin, painting, sculpture
 Anne Flournoy, filmmaker
 Jean-Honoré Fragonard, painting
 Valentino Garavani, fashion designer
 Charles Garnier, architecture
 Tony Garnier, architecture
 Eliahu Gat, painting
 David Gerstein, painting, sculpture
 Théodore Géricault, painting
 Hubert de Givenchy, fashion designer
 Louis Girault, architecture
 Jacques Gréber, landscape architect
 Aaron Goodelman, sculptor
 Liliana Gramberg, printmaker and painter
 Michael Gross, painter and sculptor
 Julien Guadet, architecture
 Yves Hernot, Painting and Surrealistic photos
 Emil Hünten, painter
 Jean-Auguste-Dominique Ingres, painting
 Charles Isabelle, architecture
 Robert Jay Wolff, painting, sculpture

 Amédée Joullin, painting
 Bernadette Kanter, sculptor
 Majida Khattari, multidisciplinary artist 
 Ludwik Konarzewski, painting and sculpture
 Jules Benoit-Lévy, painting
 Victor Laloux, architecture
 Armand Laroche, painting
 Alexandre-Louis Leloir painting and illustration
 Liem Bwan Tjie, architect
 Lin Fengmian, painting
 Frédérique Lucien, painting
 Albert Marquet, painting
 Henri Matisse, painting
 Sophie Matisse, painting
 Edgar Maxence, painting
 Annette Messager, installation, multi-media
 Vann Molyvann, architecture
 Claude Monet, painting
 Gustave Moreau, painting
 Julia Morgan, architecture, first woman to graduate from the school
 Michel Mossessian, architecture
 Marie Muracciole, curator, art critic
 Camila Oliveira Fairclough, painter
 Ong Schan Tchow alias Yung Len Kwui, painting
 Alphonse Osbert, painting
 Pan Yuliang, painting
 Jean-Louis Pascal, architecture
 Edward Plunkett, 20th Baron of Dunsany, painting and sculpture
 Christian de Portzamparc, architecture, Pritzker Prize laureate (1994)
 Théophile Poilpot, painting
 Léon Printemps, painting
 Syed Haider Raza, painting
 Alfred-Georges Regner, painting, engraving
 Pierre-Auguste Renoir, painting
 Henri Richelet, painting
 Hannes Rosenow, painting
 Georges Rouault, painting
 Abolhassan Khan Sadighi, sculptor and painter
 Bojan Šarčević, sculpture
 Louis-Frédéric Schützenberger, painting
 Mahmoud Sehili, painter
 Joann Sfar, design
 Alfred Sisley, painting
 Edward Stott, painting
 Clement Nye Swift, painting
 Siavash Teimouri, architect and historian of architecture
 António Teixeira Lopes, sculpture
 Albert-Félix-Théophile Thomas, architecture
 Roland Topor, design
 Morton Traylor, painting
 Guillaume Tronchet, architecture
 Léon Vaudoyer, architecture
 Lydia Venieri, painting, sculpture, photography, multimedia
 Adrien Voisin, American sculptor
 Lucien Weissenburger, architecture
 Lucien Wercollier, sculpture
 Elsa Werth, artist
 Xu Beihong, painting
 Yan Pei-Ming, painting
 Yan Wenliang, painting

Cour du Mûrier

See also
École des beaux-arts
Académie de peinture et de sculpture
Comité des Étudiants Américains de l'École des beaux-arts Paris
Beaux-Arts architecture
Academic art
Hôtel de Chimay
List of works by Henri Chapu

References

Review of ""Dieux et Mortels", a travelling exhibition of paintings and sculpture models from the collection of the École nationale supérieure des beaux-arts, 2004
fr:Beaux-Arts de Paris

External links

 Beaux-Arts de Paris website

Art schools in Paris
École des Beaux-Arts
Grands établissements
Buildings and structures in the 6th arrondissement of Paris
1648 establishments in France
Educational institutions established in the 1640s
•Ecole Nationale